ÍB Akureyri (abbreviated ÍBA) was a sports club based in Akureyri in the north of Iceland.

In 1928 the two Akureyri clubs Knattspyrnufélag Akureyrar and Þór Akureyri merged. In 1974, the merger was reversed and Þór Akureyri and Knattspyrnufélag Akureyrar became separate clubs again.

External links
Official website of KA Akureyri 

Defunct football clubs in Iceland
Association football clubs established in 1928
Association football clubs disestablished in 1974
1928 establishments in Iceland
1974 disestablishments in Iceland